George T. Knapp (born April 18, 1953) is an American television investigative journalist, news anchor,  and talk radio host. Knapp's earlier work has been recognized with Edward R. Murrow Awards, Peabody Awards, and 24 Pacific Southwest Regional Emmy Awards.

A longtime fixture in Las Vegas media, he works at KLAS-TV and is also a frequent host of the Sunday night/Monday morning Coast To Coast AM syndicated radio show. He is known for his work investigating UFO claims which are a frequent topic of the Coast to Coast show. George Knapp hosts Coast to Coast AM on the third and fourth Sundays of the month and sometimes the fifth Sunday.

Early life
Born in Woodbury, New Jersey, Knapp grew up in Northern California and graduated from Franklin High School in Stockton, where he was the senior class president. He earned a bachelor's degree in communication from the University of West Georgia and a master's degree in the same field from the University of the Pacific. He taught debate and forensics at both the University of the Pacific and University of California, Berkeley.

He moved to Las Vegas in the early 1980s, working first as a cab driver before being hired as an intern and then a news reporter at a PBS station. From there, Knapp was hired as a reporter and news anchor for KLAS.

Career
Knapp reported on the story of Bob Lazar, who claimed to have worked on extraterrestrial UFOs at the secretive Area 51. According to Knapp, his discovery of evidence corroborating some of Lazar's claims made his stories on Lazar be taken more seriously than typical UFO fare. In 1990, Knapp's stories on Lazar earned an "Individual Achievement by a Journalist" award from the United Press International. However, to Knapp's "eternal shame," he also during this era publicized the claims of conspiracy theorist Bill Cooper, whom Knapp came to regard as far less credible than Lazar.

Knapp was rehired by KLAS-TV in the mid 1990s when he left the public relations firm.

He wrote a regular column titled "Knappster" for the now-defunct alternative newsweeklies Las Vegas Mercury and Las Vegas CityLife.

In the late 1990s and early 2000s, Knapp worked with the now-defunct group National Institute of Discovery Science (NIDS). Founded by Las Vegas businessman Robert Bigelow, NIDS was charged with scientifically studying unusual phenomena with scientists and funding. Based on his work with NIDS and biochemist Colm Kelleher, Knapp publicized the so-called Skinwalker Ranch in northeast Utah, where strange events are alleged to have occurred.

Awards
In 2004, Knapp won a national Edward R. Murrow Award for a story about vote fraud in Clark County, Nevada.  He has also won dozens of Pacific Southwest Regional Emmy Awards,  and several writing awards from the Associated Press.

Knapp and photojournalist Matt Adams were recognized for their work on the investigative series Crossfire: Water, Power, and Politics that received a 2008 Peabody Award.

Animal welfare
Knapp has been concerned with animal welfare since the beginning of his journalism career. Since hosting occasionally with Coast to Coast AM, he hosts an annual animal welfare broadcast concerning issues, the development of law, animal cruelty and remediation efforts. The 2016 broadcast covered various issues including horses and trophy hunting, noting the almost one year anniversary since the killing of Cecil the lion and the effect the incident was still causing at the date of the show.

References

External links
 
 Profile at Coast to Coast AM
 George Knapp, TV Newsman, First Publicized Bob Lazar
 Transcript of an Interview from November 17, 1989  by Chuck Harder
 Mystery Wire

1953 births
Living people
American male journalists
American talk radio hosts
American television reporters and correspondents
American UFO writers
Coast to Coast AM
Emmy Award winners
Journalists from New Jersey
Journalists from Las Vegas
Nevada Democrats
Peabody Award winners
People from Woodbury, New Jersey
Television anchors from Las Vegas
Ufologists
University of the Pacific (United States) alumni
University of West Georgia alumni